Enzo Rosa (Balzola, April 24, 1913 – Varazze, February 20, 1994) was an Italian professional football player.

Honours
 Serie A champion: 1931/32.

1913 births
1994 deaths
People from Balzola
Italian footballers
Serie A players
Juventus F.C. players
F.C. Pavia players
Atalanta B.C. players
Casale F.B.C. players
Piacenza Calcio 1919 players
Association football forwards
A.S.D. La Biellese players
Pinerolo F.C. players
Footballers from Piedmont
Sportspeople from the Province of Alessandria